Lady Washington Inn is a historic inn and tavern building located at Huntingdon Valley, Montgomery County, Pennsylvania. It was built in three sections in 1761, about 1788–1785, and about 1850–1875.  It is a 2 1/2-story, stuccoed stone and frame building with a gable roof and frame rear addition.

It was added to the National Register of Historic Places in 1982.

References

Hotel buildings completed in 1761
Hotel buildings on the National Register of Historic Places in Pennsylvania
Buildings and structures in Montgomery County, Pennsylvania
Taverns in Pennsylvania
1761 establishments in Pennsylvania
National Register of Historic Places in Montgomery County, Pennsylvania
Drinking establishments on the National Register of Historic Places in Pennsylvania